Cryptocellus becki is an arachnid species in the genus Cryptocellus. It can be found in the Amazon rainforest.

References

External links 
 

Arthropods of South America
Arthropods of Brazil
Ricinulei
Animals described in 1977